Yandian is a town under the administration of the county-level city of Anlu in northeastern Hubei province, China, located  northwest of downtown Anlu and just east of G70 Fuzhou–Yinchuan Expressway.

History 
During the Tang Dynasty, famed Chinese poet Li Bai lived and wrote poems at Bi Mountain, today Baizhao Mountain in Yandian.

In 2017 fifth periodical awarding of the title, the town of Yandian was given the title "National Civilized Town". Yandian has also received other awards and titles including "China's Most Beautiful Town", "China's Most Unique Town", "National Ecological Town",  "Provincial Public Health Town", "Hubei Forestry Town", "Hubei Model Town for New Rural Construction", "Most Attractive Tourist Town in Hubei", "National Civilized Town" "123 Pilot Demonstration Town Industry Amalgamation in Rural Areas in Hubei", and "Tourist Town with Chinese Characteristics" and other honorary titles, was nominated for "Most Beautiful Jingchu Culture Town".

Geography 
The town of Yandian is located in the central part of Anlu. It is bounded to the east by the Yun river and to the west by Baizhao Mountain. The terrain is higher in the west and lower in the east. There is a belt of mountains, a belt of hills and a belt of flat land. Yandian contains the rich resources of river sand, clay, limestone and other mineral resources.

Administrative divisions 
, the town of Yandian had 40 villages under its administration. , it was made up of forty village-level divisions including four communities and thirty-six villages.

Four communities:
Yuanfan, Yuzhai, Songlong, and Baidian
 
Thirty-six villages:
Yandian, Bishan, Zhouqiao, Shuizhai, Shuangling, Baishu, Chalu, Ligang, Jianshan, Feigang, Xiaowan, Changgang, Zhouci, Huangpeng, Guanyan, Zhanggang, Zhouchong, Liwan, Tianwan, Chengxiang, Gonggang, Wanqiao, Wanggang, Shuangmiao, Denghe, Denggang, Henglu, Dongqiao, Shihe, Zhuluo, Fengmiao, Yaozha, Huangzha, Dengchong, Balicun, and Pengqiao

Economy 
Yandian's industries include stone processing, pottery/earth building materials, agriculture, and tourist services. Tourist attractions include the Local Culture Historical Street, Model Tang Dynasty Ancient Village with Tang Dynasty flags, Taibai Street with 400 stores, numerous statues of Li Bai and a large 3-D version of Li Bai.

Demographics

Transportation 
Seven major roads cross through Yandian including Wuhan-Shiyan Expressway and Railway, Provincial Roads Yanying Highway, Anjing Highway, Datian Highway, and City Roads Ansan Road and Shuiqing Road. In all, there is 118.7 kilometers of highway.

Culture 
Li Bai lived and wrote poems at Bi Mountain, today Baizhao Mountain.  Bi Mountain in the poem Question and Answer Amongst the Mountains refers to this mountain.

See also 
 List of township-level divisions of Hubei

References 

Township-level divisions of Hubei